Mabee Center is a 10,154-seat multi-purpose arena, located on the campus of Oral Roberts University, in Tulsa, Oklahoma, United States.  The building opened in 1972 and was designed by architect Frank Wallace, who designed most of the buildings on the ORU campus.  It carries the name of Tulsa oilman John Mabee,  whose foundation donated $1 million toward its construction.

The facility received several substantial upgrades in 2021 including: new arena seats, exterior blue paint, blue glass panels, a brand new sound system, all new LED house lights, concourse level remodeling, digital screens, state-of-the-art wifi, and new suites. An adjacent building, smaller but similar in shape, is known as the "Global Learning Center".

Since it opened in 1972, the Mabee Center has hosted some of the biggest entertainers in the industry along with the NAIA national men's basketball championship (1994–1998), five NCAA men's first-round or regional tournaments (1974, 1975, 1978, 1982, 1985) and the Midwestern City Conference (now Horizon League) men's basketball conference tournaments (1982, 1985).

It is home to the Oral Roberts Golden Eagles men's and women's basketball teams and was Eastern Oklahoma's largest arena until the BOK Center was built. Mabee Center was inducted into the Oklahoma Music Hall of Fame in 2013 and in 2022, Mabee Center celebrates 50 years of family-friendly entertainment.

See also
 List of NCAA Division I basketball arenas

References

External links
MabeeCenter.com
Mabee Center History

College basketball venues in the United States
Indoor arenas in Oklahoma
Oral Roberts Golden Eagles men's basketball
Buildings and structures in Tulsa, Oklahoma
Sports venues in Tulsa, Oklahoma
Basketball venues in Oklahoma
1972 establishments in Oklahoma
Sports venues completed in 1972